The Faculty of Tropical AgriSciences (FTA) (Czech: Fakulta tropického zemědělství (FTZ)) is a part of the Czech University of Life Sciences Prague (CZU). The Faculty was established in 2013 by the transformation of the Institute of tropics and subtropics (ITS). The current dean is prof. dr. ir. Patrick Van Damme. Prof. Patrick Van Damme became the second dean of the Faculty of Tropical AgriSciences (FTA) but the first dean ever as a foreign national in the history of the Czech Republic (not counting deans from Slovakia). The Faculty is located in the campus of the CZU in Prague, the Czech Republic.

The main mission of the FTA is education of students and publication of research results in the field of agriculture, rural development and sustainable management of natural and energy resources in the tropics and subtropics.

History 
The history of the faculty starts in 1961 when the "Department of World Agriculture and Forestry" was established at the Faculty of Forestry, University of Agriculture in Prague. In 1967, the department was transformed to the Institute of Tropical and Subtropical Agriculture as a part of Faculty of Economics and Management of the University of Agriculture in Prague. The Institute becomes independent institution of the university in 1991 and changed the name to Institute of Tropics and Subtropics in 2005. In 2013, the Faculty Tropical AgriSciences was established by the decision of the academic senate of the Czech university of Life Sciences Prague.

Directors of the Institute 
 prof. MVDr. Jaroslav Červenka, CSc. (1965–1972)
 prof. Ing. František Pospíšil, CSc. (1972–1977)
 doc. Ing. Jiří Jára, CSc. (1977–1987)
 prof. Ing. Jiří Havel, CSc. (1987–1989)
 doc. MVDr. Jiří Houška, CSc. (1990–1991)
 prof. Ing. Jan Bláha, CSc. (1991–1995)
 doc. Ing. Karel Otto, CSc. (1996–2000)
 prof. Ing. Bohumil Havrland, CSc. (2000-2012)
 prof. Ing. Jan Banout, Ph.D. (2012-2013)

Deans 
 prof. Ing. Jan Banout, Ph.D. (2013 - 2021)
 prof. dr. ir. Patrick Van Damme (since 2021)

Structure 

The FTA has four departments:
 Department of Crop Sciences and Agroforestry
 Department of Sustainable Technologies
 Department of Animal Science and Food Processing
 Department of Economics and Development

Other faculty units:
 Botanical Garden
 Common Eland and Guanaco Farm

Studies 
The faculty actually offers study in two bachelor', six master's and three doctoral programs which are all (except one bachelor) taught in English. The total number of students in bachelors' and masters' study programmes is 503, of which 331 are foreigners.

Study programmes 
  bachelor's degree programmes
 Agriculture in Tropics and Subtropics - Tropické Zemědělství - taught in Czech
 International Cooperation in Agriculture and Rural Development - taught in English
 master's degree programmes (taught in English)
 Agri-food Systems and Rural Development
 International Development and Agricultural Economics 
 Tropical Crop Management and Ecology 
 Tropical Forestry and Agroforestry 
 Tropical Farming Systems 
 Wildlife and Livestock Production, Management and Conservation
 PhD studies (taught in English)
 Sustainable Rural Development
 Agriculture in Tropics and Subtropics 
 Tropical Agrobiology and Bioresource Management

References 

Universities in the Czech Republic
Educational institutions in Prague
Educational institutions established in 1961
Agricultural universities and colleges in the Czech Republic
1961 establishments in Czechoslovakia